Antonio de Santana Portugal Neto (born 7 December 1989 in Bahia) is a Brazilian footballer who plays as a midfielder for VSI Tampa Bay FC in the USL Pro.

Career
Neto layed early with Ipatinga Futebol Clube and Associação Atlética São Francisco De Conde.

VSI Tampa Bay
Neto signed with VSI Tampa Bay FC in March, 2013. He made his debut for the club on April 2, 2013 where he scored a debut goal in a 1-0 victory over Los Angeles Blues.

Career statistics

Club
Statistics accurate as of 2 April 2013

References

1989 births
Living people
Sportspeople from Bahia
USL Championship players
Association football midfielders
Expatriate soccer players in the United States
Brazilian footballers
Brazilian expatriate sportspeople in the United States
VSI Tampa Bay FC players
Brazilian expatriate footballers